Hugues Krafft (1853 – 1935) was a photographer born in Paris. He travelled around the world, and visited Japan in 1882–1883. He left numerous quality photographs of the period. 

He was among the first to use instantaneous photography in Japan (he used a Zeiss camera with gelatine-silver bromide plates, a process which became widely available in 1880), which allowed him to take vivid pictures in an open environment, in contrast to the many staged studio photographs made by his predecessors.

Works
Souvenirs de notre tour du monde (1885)  
A travers le Turkestan russe (1902)
A travers le Turkestan russe : ouvrage illustré de deux cent-soixante-cinq gravures d'après les clichés de l'auteur et contenant une carte en couleurs (1902)

Gallery

See also

List of French photographers
Felice Beato

References

 Anglo-American Name Authority File, s.v. “Krafft, Hugues”, LC Control Number n 88619670. Accessed 27 March 2007.
 Esmein, Suzanne. Hugues Krafft au Japon de Meiji: photographies d'un voyage, 1882–1883  (Paris : Hermann, 2003). .
 Ladam, Nicolas. Le Voyage d'Hugues Krafft au Soleil Levant. Pratiques du voyage et représentations du Japon d'un grand bourgeois français dans les années 1880, mémoire de Master d'Histoire soutenu à l'université de Reims Champagne-Ardenne, sous la direction de Catherine Nicault, 2008. Available for free here 

1853 births
1935 deaths
French photographers
Pioneers of photography
French expatriates in Japan